Rock Lane was a railway station on the Chester and Birkenhead Railway in Cheshire, England. It opened in June 1846 and closed on 1 November 1862, and it consisted of two platforms (only one up to 1847).

In July 1847, the railway became part of the Birkenhead, Lancashire and Cheshire Junction Railway which doubled the line, probably adding the second platform to Rock Lane at this time. In 1862, Rock Lane Station closed, to be replaced with a new station a short distance away, called Rock Ferry.

In 1891, the Birkenhead And Chester Line quadrupled the track, destroying any remains of the station.

References

Further reading
 Subterranea Britannica's Page on Rock Lane Station

Disused railway stations in the Metropolitan Borough of Wirral
Former Birkenhead Railway stations
Railway stations in Great Britain opened in 1846
Railway stations in Great Britain closed in 1862
1846 establishments in England